Theodore "Ted" Sgambelluri Nelson (born May 17, 1935) is a Guamanian retired politician. A member of the Democratic Party of Guam, Nelson served as Vice Speaker of Guam Legislature and senator in the Guam Legislature for 6 terms.

Biography
He was born on May 17, 1935, to Peter Flores Torres Nelson and Laura Sgambelluri. Nelson graduated from George Washington High School. He earned an Associate of Arts degree from the College of Guam, a bachelor's degree from Ohio State University, and a master's degree from the University of New Mexico.

Nelson taught physical education at George Washington High School. He served as vice principal of George Washington Junior High School and later John F. Kennedy High School. He served as principal at George Washington Junior and Senior High Schools. He served as a special assistant under Governor Camacho and Governor Bordallo.

Nelson was married to Gloria Camacho Borja and has four children (Gwendolyn "Gwen", Theodore "Ted" Jr., Glenn and Rhonda) and one adopted daughter (Mary Adelbai Wenty).

Nelson is the paternal grandfather of Senator Telena Cruz Nelson.

Arriola-Nelson Gubernatorial Ticket
In 1974, Joaquin C. "Kin" Arriola teamed up with Nelson in the Democratic Party of Guam Gubernatorial Primary. In the primary, Arriola-Nelson placed 4th against the teams of Ricardo Bordallo and Rudolph G. Sablan, Pedro C. Sanchez and Esteban U. Torres, and Manuel F.L. Guerrero and David D.L. Flores, with 1,254 votes.

Guam Constitutional Convention 1977
During the 1977 Guam Constitutional Convention, Nelson served as a delegate from Mongmong-Toto-Maite and secretary of the convention.

Guam Legislature

Elections

Leadership roles
Nelson served as vice president of the Association of Pacific Island Legislatures from January 1, 1995, to December 31, 1996.

See also
 Guam Legislature
 Democratic Party of Guam

References

External links
 32nd Guam Legislature's official website

1935 births
20th-century American politicians
21st-century American politicians
Chamorro people
Guamanian Democrats
Guamanian people of Spanish descent
Guamanian Roman Catholics
Living people
Members of the Legislature of Guam
University of Guam alumni